It operates a service portal to assist students finding student jobs, especially babysitting and private accommodation.

Associated Universities and Colleges 

The Studierendenwerk serves the students of the following colleges:

Albert-Ludwigs-Universität Freiburg
Pädagogische Hochschule Freiburg
Hochschule für Musik Freiburg
Evangelische Hochschule Freiburg
Katholische Hochschule Freiburg
IBA Studienort Freiburg
Hochschule für Kunst, Design und Populäre Musik Freiburg
Angell Akademie Freiburg GmbH
Hochschule Offenburg
Hochschule für öffentliche Verwaltung Kehl
Hochschule Furtwangen
Duale Hochschule Baden-Württemberg Villingen-Schwenningen

Functions 

The functions of the Studierendenwerke in Baden-Württemberg are stated in section two of the Studierendenwerk's charter. These functions are principally implemented through the following areas, measures and facilities:

Gastronomy
Student housing
Promotion of cultural, sporting and social interests
Childcare
Promotion of healthy lifestyles and health guidance
Guidance for international students 
The acquirement of financial help during studies

The Studierendenwerk also assumes the task of processing BAföG (German student finance) applications.

Organs 
The Studierendenwerk is represented by three organs: 
The manager, Clemens Metz, conducts business and is the supervisor of the employees. 
The administrative board consists of three representatives of the universities, three representatives of the students, three external experts working in either the public sector or municipal administration, and one representative of the Ministry of Education and Research. The administrative board appoints, oversees, and advises the manager. 
The assembly of representatives consists of members of the rectorate and the executive boards of the universities. It decides on the constitution of the Studierendenwerk and elects the members of the administrative board.

Mensa Card 
In the Studierendenwerk's establishments, payments are mostly made without cash, using a smart card. This so-called MensaCard is given to all registered students. It serves as a student ID, and is also used as a means of access to the facilities of the colleges. For a fee, the MensaCard is also given to visitors.

Student dormitories 

The Studierendenwerk currently manages 17 dormitories in the region:

Hochschulservice GmbH 

The Studierendenwerk is the sole shareholder of the subsidiary company Hochschulservice GmbH (Higher education service Ltd). In this company, there are around 39 permanent and 200 part-time workers. It is often criticised for the low wages it pays its staff. The reason for this is that most employees are catering staff, who are paid according to the Food, Beverages and Catering Union (NGG) rate. This pay is lower than the public services wage agreement of the region, according to which the employees of the Studierendenwerk itself are paid.

External links 
 www.swfr.de
 Studierendenwerksgesetz (StWG)

References 

Education in Freiburg im Breisgau